A Presidential Statement is often created when the United Nations Security Council cannot reach consensus or are prevented from passing a resolution by a permanent member's veto, or threat thereof. Such statements are similar in content, format, and tone to resolutions, but are not legally binding.

The adoption of a Presidential Statement requires consensus, although Security Council members may abstain.  The Statement is signed by the sitting Security Council President.

References

External links
 Presidential Statements of the Security Council

Statements
United Nations Security Council